Kevon Harris (born 1 June 1981) is a Jamaican footballer who played one season in the USL First Division and earned one cap with the Jamaica national football team.

Career
Harris began his career with Santos F.C. (Jamaica) in 2000 before moving to the United States to play college soccer at Old Dominion University for three years. He was a 2004 Second Team All American at Old Dominion. On 18 January 2005, the Virginia Beach Mariners selected Harris with the fourth pic of the USL First Division College Draft.  He spent the 2005 season with the Mariners. After spending the next two years out of soccer, Harris signed with PDL club, Hampton Roads Piranhas in 2008.

International
Harris made one appearance for the Jamaica national team, in a 2–0 loss to Grenada on 8 January 2001.

References

External links

1981 births
Living people
Jamaican footballers
Jamaican expatriate footballers
Jamaica international footballers
Old Dominion Monarchs men's soccer players
Virginia Beach Mariners players
Virginia Beach Piranhas players
USL First Division players
USL League Two players
Santos F.C. (Jamaica) players
Association football defenders